Polyacanthia is a genus of longhorn beetles of the subfamily Lamiinae, containing the following species:

 Polyacanthia femoralis (Sharp, 1886)
 Polyacanthia flavipes (White, 1846)
 Polyacanthia fonscolombei Montrouzier, 1861
 Polyacanthia medialis (Sharp, 1886)
 Polyacanthia simplex (Bates, 1874)
 Polyacanthia stictica (Bates, 1874)
 Polyacanthia strandi Breuning, 1939

References

Pogonocherini